The high-top is a shoe that extends slightly over the wearer's ankle. It is commonly an athletic shoe, particularly for basketball. It is sometimes confused with the slightly shorter mid-top, which typically extends no higher than the wearer's ankle. High-tops also should not be confused with shorter-length boots such as ankle boots, since high-tops usually refer to athletic shoes, although can also refer to other above-ankle shoes such as some hiking boots.

Converse All-Stars, Nike Air Forces 1, 2, and 3, Reebok Freestyle, Reebok BB4600, Nike Air Yeezy and Foggia Hi LTD from Fila are examples of high top sneakers. Others include skateboarding sneakers, such as the Vans Vault Hi Fi LX which are quite supportive to the wearer's ankles and are useful to those with hypermobility and fallen arches.

Design 
While most high-top sneakers take the form of either the Converse All-Stars or Nike Air Forces 1, 2, and 3, high-top CVO (Circular Vamp Oxford) cover the ankle and also have a circular vamp.  They come in both lace up and slip-on, thought the slip-on version is very rare.  In British English these would be high-top plimsolls again either in lace up or slip-on.  Various manufacturers and models exist, including Keds, Pro-Keds, and Converse.  These exist for all genders and all age ranges. The shoes have recently come back in style in 2014, especially white ones.

Some dress and casual shoes may also be as high-tops.

Gallery

References 

 The Sneaker Book: 50 Years of Sports Shoe Design, 2005, .

1980s fashion
Athletic shoes